The Marquette County Courthouse and Marquette County Sheriff's Office and Jail is located in Montello, Wisconsin. In 1982, the site was added to the National Register of Historic Places.

Description
The current courthouse was constructed in 1918 to replace the original that had been built in 1863. It was built out of stone and brick. The sheriff's office and jail is located behind the courthouse.

References

Courthouses on the National Register of Historic Places in Wisconsin
Jails on the National Register of Historic Places in Wisconsin
Buildings and structures in Marquette County, Wisconsin
Beaux-Arts architecture in Wisconsin
Government buildings completed in 1918
National Register of Historic Places in Marquette County, Wisconsin
Government buildings in Wisconsin
County courthouses in Wisconsin
Jails in Wisconsin